James Robert Langfield (born 22 December 1979) is a Scottish football player and coach, who is currently the goalkeeping coach at St Mirren. Langfield, who played as a goalkeeper, started his career with Dundee. He then played for Partick Thistle and Dunfermline Athletic before joining Aberdeen in 2005. He went on to spend the next decade with Aberdeen, regaining his place in the team after being dropped for off-field indiscipline in 2007, a loss of form in 2008 and then again in 2012 after suffering a brain seizure that kept him out of competitive action for nine months. He was voted the Aberdeen player of the year in 2009 and was part of the team that won the Scottish League Cup in 2014.

Langfield played for Scotland in a B international in 2007 and was a member of the senior squad without being selected for a full cap. In 2015 Langfield joined hometown club St Mirren and played regularly until May 2017 before becoming their goalkeeping coach. Langfield was caretaker manager of St Mirren after Jim Goodwin left the club in February 2022.

Career

Early career
Langfield was born in Paisley and started his career as a youth player at Dundee. Langfield was released by Dundee when the club went into administration, and signed a short term deal with Raith Rovers. Langfield went on to sign for Partick Thistle and Dunfermline Athletic.

Aberdeen
Langfield signed for Aberdeen in 2005. At the start of his Aberdeen spell, he was the second-choice goalkeeper behind Ryan Esson, but he soon took over from Esson as first choice and during season 2006–07, Aberdeen finished third and qualified for the UEFA Cup. In May 2007, he rejected a move to Rangers, preferring the option of more first-team opportunities at Aberdeen.

In June 2007, while enjoying his stag party on holiday in Magaluf, he had a drunken argument with Aberdeen manager Jimmy Calderwood after bumping into him in a chance encounter, with the incident putting his future at Aberdeen in doubt. Langfield himself stated he wasn't able to remember what happened as he was so drunk. The club later confirmed that they had made him available for transfer with an asking price of £100,000. As a result of the incident, Langfield was not only demoted to the bench, with Derek Soutar made first choice, but it caused some supporters to turn on him.

Having been on the bench for the season's first six matches, Langfield made his first appearance in a 0–0 draw against Ukrainian side Dnipro Dnipropetrovsk in the UEFA Cup. Aberdeen went through to the next round after a 1–1 draw in the second leg, which resulted in a victory on away goals. The day after Aberdeen's victory over FC Copenhagen on 20 December 2007, Langfield signed a three-year extension to his contract to keep him at the club until 2011. During early 2008, Langfield experienced a drop in form, starting on 5 February when Aberdeen lost 4–1 to Dundee United in the CIS Insurance Cup. This led him being dropped as a first choice, but once again he regained the place after being on the bench for seven matches.

Langfield was ever-present in the league for the 2008–09 season and was linked a move to England, but stated he was happy to stay at Aberdeen. When Jimmy Calderwood left the club at the end of that season he claimed Langfield was also looking to leave, but the player pledged his commitment to the club.

In July 2010, ahead of the 2010–11 season, Langfield injured himself by spilling boiling water on his foot. Because of the injury, he did not return to the team until 18 September 2010, in a 1–1 draw against Motherwell; after the game, Langfield described the injury as "a freak accident and it was bloody painful." Langfield was in goal as Celtic beat Aberdeen 9–0 on 9 November 2010, which holds the record not only as the biggest ever win in the SPL, but also the biggest ever defeat in Aberdeen's history. Langfield revealed he was in tears following the match, and commented that he would be remembered as a keeper who conceded nine goals for the rest of his career. On 11 December 2010, he conceded five goals, in a 5–0 loss against Heart of Midlothian. Langfield played his 200th match in his Aberdeen career in a 2–0 win over St Mirren.

In May 2011, Langfield signed a one-year extension to his Aberdeen contract. He was previously told he had to take a pay-cut if he were to stay at the club, having been amongst three of the Dons highest-paid players. Later that month, he suffered a brain seizure and was taken to hospital in Glasgow. Two days later, he was released from hospital as he continued his recovery. Aberdeen manager Craig Brown said he would allow Langfield to decide when he would resume playing and said he would not be back in action until he was 100 per cent. He returned to training in September 2011. Following his return, Brown stated he was considering letting Langfield join a club on loan, describing it as "a bit premature to be thinking about putting him into the first team". Langfield admitted he thought the seizure could have ended his career but that he believed it could make him a better keeper, and he would be taking medication in case of another seizure.

Langfield was loaned to Forfar Athletic in November for one month to gain some match practice. After making two appearances, he returned to Aberdeen. After nine months out, Langfield made his return to the Aberdeen first team in a 2–0 win over Inverness Caledonian Thistle on 21 April 2012. After the match, he stated he enjoyed making his comeback. After speculation in the previous month that Langfield could leave the club in order to search for regular first team football, he was offered a new two-year contract on 25 April 2012, which he signed seven days later.

The start of the 2012–13 season saw Langfield start the opening game against champions Celtic. Aberdeen lost the game 1–0 with the only goal coming from a shot by Kris Commons which Langfield let slip under his body. The goalkeeper was then subject to abuse on the social networking site Twitter, with references made to the brain seizure that he had suffered the previous year. In November, he went a second scheduled operation and following this, he was given the all-clear. On 15 December 2012, Langfield was sent-off after a straight red card following a foul on Borja Perez of Kilmarnock, resulting a penalty. After the match the club said they would appeal his sending off, but this was rejected by The Scottish Football Association, meaning he served a one match suspension. Langfield scored an own goal on 2 January 2013 in a 2–2 draw against the club's rivals, Dundee United. Following a 0–0 draw against Hibernian on 22 April 2013, Langfield earned his 84th SPL clean-sheet, taking him a step closer to overtaking Stefan Klos, Allan McGregor and Rab Douglas, the only players with more.

In the 2013–14 season, Langfield gave away a penalty and received a red card in the third match of the season, as Aberdeen lost 2–0 against Celtic. In September and October 2013, Langfield only conceded a total of two goals. The following month, he signed a contract extension, keeping him at the club until 2016. Langfield started in goal in the Scottish League Cup final against Inverness Caledonian Thistle, where he played the entire match which finished 0–0 after extra–time and went to a penalty-shootout; Aberdeen won 4–2 on penalties, with Langfield's save from one of the Inverness attempts sealing victory. After the match, Langfield said "winning a cup at Parkhead with a team I love and I want to be part of. That's incredible." The club's goalkeeper coach Jim Leighton said of Langfield: "I've never seen Jamie play better than he is at the moment. It's great to see him reaping the rewards for the effort I see him putting in at training every day."

The 2014–15 season started well for Langfield when he started and played all 90 minutes in the club's six matches in the UEFA Europa League qualifying rounds, in which he kept three clean sheets. Langfield then started as a first-choice goalkeeper until he conceded three goals in a 3–0 defeat to Hamilton Academical on 17 October 2014. As a result, he was placed on the bench and Scott Brown was made first choice from the next match against Motherwell onwards. Langfield made his return to the first team on 13 March 2015 in a 2–1 win over the same opposition, and featured for two more matches before being replaced again by Brown for the rest of the season.

Langfield was awarded a testimonial by Aberdeen in 2015. The match against Brighton and Hove Albion was played on 26 July 2015 and ended 1–0 with Adam Rooney scoring the only goal. At half time, some of Langfield's former teammates including Darren Mackie, Lee Miller, Derek Young, Lee Mair, Barry Nicholson, Scott Severin and Michael Hart played in a mini match. Langfield later tweeted "Thank you for everything always in mine and my family's hearts #COYR." He was also in consideration for the club's goalkeeping coach before the role went to Gordon Marshall.

On 11 August 2015, Aberdeen announced that they had reached an agreement with Langfield to terminate the remainder of his contract with the club.

St Mirren
On 13 August 2015, Langfield signed a two-year player-coach contract with St Mirren. After a successful first season with Saints, Langfield dropped to the bench for most of season 2016–17 and concentrated on a coaching role. He signed a new one-year contract in May 2017, where it was anticipated he would continue in a non-playing capacity.

Langfield was re-registered as a player and was on the bench for St Mirren's Scottish Premiership game against Hibernian in September 2020 after goalkeepers Jak Alnwick, Dean Lyness and Peter Urminsky were all ruled out due to COVID‑19 protocols.

He was made caretaker manager of St Mirren in February 2022, following the departure of Jim Goodwin.

International
Langfield made one Scotland B appearance. He was called up to the senior Scotland team several times but never gained a full cap.

Personal life
Jamie grew up in Paisley, with his parents, three younger brothers and a younger sister. Following the brain seizure that affected his career, Langfield helped raise money for the charity BareAll4BTs which helps those affected by brain tumours, by auctioning his gloves. 

Career statistics

HonoursAberdeen'
 Scottish League Cup: 2013–14

References

External links

 Guardian Stats Centre

1979 births
Footballers from Paisley, Renfrewshire
Living people
Association football goalkeepers
Association football coaches
Scottish footballers
Scotland under-21 international footballers
Scotland B international footballers
Dundee F.C. players
Raith Rovers F.C. players
Partick Thistle F.C. players
Dunfermline Athletic F.C. players
Aberdeen F.C. players
Scottish Football League players
Scottish Premier League players
Forfar Athletic F.C. players
Scottish Professional Football League players
St Mirren F.C. players
St Mirren F.C. non-playing staff